The Mural Limestone is a geologic formation of the Bisbee Group in Arizona and Mexico. It preserves fossils dating back to the Cretaceous period.

See also 

 List of fossiliferous stratigraphic units in Arizona
 List of fossiliferous stratigraphic units in Mexico
 Paleontology in Arizona

References

External links 
 

Geologic formations of Arizona
Cretaceous System of North America
Geologic formations of Mexico
Cretaceous Mexico